Bryan Moody  (born 16 January 1972) is a Canadian badminton player who affiliated with the Glencoe club in Calgary. He represented Canada at the 2000 Summer Olympics and 1998 Commonwealth Games. Moody was three times national champion. He also won the bronze medals at the 1997 Pan Am Championships, and 1999 Pan American Games.

Achievements

Pan American Games
Men's doubles

Pan Am Championships
Men's doubles

IBF International
Men's doubles

References

External links
 
 
 
 

1972 births
Living people
People from Pointe-Claire
Sportspeople from Quebec
Canadian male badminton players
Olympic badminton players of Canada
Badminton players at the 2000 Summer Olympics
Commonwealth Games competitors for Canada
Badminton players at the 1998 Commonwealth Games
Badminton players at the 1999 Pan American Games
Pan American Games bronze medalists for Canada
Pan American Games medalists in badminton
Medalists at the 1999 Pan American Games